Emanuel Kišerlovski (born 3 August 1984) is a Croatian racing cyclist, who currently rides for UCI Continental team . He rode at the 2014 UCI Road World Championships, and is the brother of fellow racing cyclist Robert Kišerlovski.

Major results

2006
 3rd Time trial, National Road Championships
2008
 6th Overall The Paths of King Nikola
 8th Raiffeisen Grand Prix
2009
 3rd Road race, National Road Championships
 8th Zagreb–Ljubljana
 10th Tour of Vojvodina I
2011
 4th Central European Tour Miskolc GP
2012
 7th Overall Sibiu Cycling Tour
2013
 3rd Road race, National Road Championships
2014
 National Road Championships
2nd Road race
3rd Time trial
2015
 1st  Road race, National Road Championships
 7th Overall Tour of Croatia
2016
 3rd Road race, National Road Championships
2017
 3rd Road race, National Road Championships
2018
 4th Road race, National Road Championships

References

External links
 

1984 births
Living people
Croatian male cyclists
Sportspeople from Čačak
European Games competitors for Croatia
Cyclists at the 2015 European Games
21st-century Croatian people